A Safe Affair is a 1931 British crime film directed by Herbert Wynne and starring Franklin Dyall, Connie Emerald and Douglas Jefferies. It was a quota quickie made at the Nettlefold Studios in Walton-upon-Thames, and distributed by the Hollywood studio MGM.

Cast
 Franklin Dyall as Rupert Gay  
 Connie Emerald as Blonde  
 Douglas Jefferies as Henry 
 James Knight as Tom  
 J. Neil More as Otto Crann  
 J.H. Roberts as Judd  
 Jeanne Stuart as Olga Delgaroff  
 George Turner as Jim  
 Nancy Welford as Mary Bolton

References

Bibliography
 Low, Rachael. Filmmaking in 1930s Britain. George Allen & Unwin, 1985.
 Wood, Linda. British Films, 1927-1939. British Film Institute, 1986.

External links

1931 films
British crime films
1931 crime films
Films shot at Nettlefold Studios
Films set in England
Quota quickies
British black-and-white films
1930s English-language films
1930s British films